USNS Robert E. Peary (T-AKE-5) is a Lewis and Clark-class dry cargo ship in the United States Navy. She is the fourth Navy ship named for Arctic explorer, Rear Admiral Robert E. Peary (1856–1920).

Construction
The contract to build Robert E. Peary was awarded to National Steel and Shipbuilding Company (NASSCO) of San Diego, California, on 27 January 2004. Her keel was laid down on 12 December 2006 and she was launched on schedule on 27 October 2007. However, the planned christening ceremony had to be delayed because of the local disruption caused by the October 2007 California wildfires.

The Robert E. Peary was christened on 9 February 2008, sponsored by Peary's great-granddaughter Peary S. Fowler, a judge in Monroe County, Florida.

Operational history
On 10 March 2017, Robert E. Peary berthed in HM Naval Base Portsmouth to test the newly built facilities for the Queen Elizabeth Class aircraft carriers.

In popular culture 
The ship was featured in the Discovery Channel's Mighty Ships.

Gallery

References 
 Based on data from the Naval Vessel Register and press releases.

External links 

Lewis and Clark-class dry cargo ships
2007 ships